Caquetio, Caiquetio, or Caiquetia are natives of northwestern Venezuela, living along the shores of Lake Maracaibo at the time of the Spanish conquest.  They moved inland to avoid enslavement by the Spaniards, while their numbers were drastically affected by colonial warfare, as were their neighbours, the Quiriquire and the Jirajara. The Caquetíos were also present in Aruba, Curaçao and Bonaire when these islands were first colonized by Alonso de Ojeda in 1499. The occupants of this region were known as Caquetíos by the Spaniards and their language (Caquetío) belongs to the Arawakan family of languages. The Caquetío and the Jirajara spoke the same language, and their cultures were quite similar. The Arawakan or Caquetío language is termed a "ghost" language because virtually no trace of it survives. Only the name remains, saved in 17th-century texts.

Aruba, Curaçao and Bonaire
When the Spanish arrived in Aruba around 1500 they found the Caiquetios in Aruba, living much as they did in the Stone Age.  The Caiquetios had probably migrated to Aruba, Curaçao and Bonaire in canoes made from hollowed out logs they used for fishing.  Such crossings from the Paraguana peninsula in Venezuela, across the 17 miles (27 km) of open sea to Aruba, would be possible in the canoes the Caiquetios of Venezuela built.

Settlement areas in Venezuela and Colombia 
"This nation is very large, but lives in many areas separated from each other," so the summary of the 16th century chronicler Juan de Castellanos.    

The Caquetío settled not only in the coastal region in the west of what is now Venezuela, but in at least two other regions: the valley of Barquisimeto in the state of Lara and in what is now Colombia's Llanos Orientales. In the fertile valley of Barquisimeto, according to Nikolaus Federmann, the first conquistador to enter their land, there were 23 large settlements and they could muster 30,000 warriors.  According to concurring reports of the chroniclers Juan de Castellanos and Gonzalo Fernández de Oviedo y Valdés, they inhabited the savannas from the Rio Apure in the north to beyond the Rio Casanare in the south. The west-east extension of the "Grassland Caquetío" was from the edge of the Andes to far into the savannas, possibly as far as the Rio Meta.

Spanish period 
During the first years of colonization, the natives of Aruba were described by the Spaniards as Caquetíos. In addition, the Caquetíos in the mainland were the tribe geographically closest to Aruba, and archaeological evidence points towards close ties between both groups during pre-Columbian times. Perhaps as many as 600 lived in Aruba at the time of the Spanish arrival in 1499.

Together with Curaçao and Bonaire, Aruba was declared an island without use in 1513, and two years later some 2000 Caquetíos from the three islands combined were transported to Hispaniola to work in mines. These people presumably comprised the entire population of the islands, but 150 to 200 were returned to Aruba and Curaçao in 1526 to work on the exportation of brazilwood, kwihi, and divi-divi. The people returned to Aruba and Curaçao were mainly Caquetíos, but some Arawaks from other Caribbean islands were included in the group. Because of the complexity of the Aruba cave labyrinths, it is possible that they were mostly natives who had escaped deportation, but they could have been recent migrants from the mainland. In addition, substantial mainland-to-Aruba migrations of escapees occurred from 1529 to 1556, during the development of the Venezuelan colony (Haviser, 1991).

Dutch period 
Aruba was neglected by the Spaniards from 1533 until the Dutch conquest of 1636, when Spanish and native languages (especially Caquetío) were widely spoken. Upon the Dutch conquest the Spaniards fled, and the natives were deported to the mainland because they were regarded as sympathetic to the Spaniards. However, in that same year of 1636, the Dutch West Indian Company (WIC) assigned Aruba the duty of breeding horses and cattle, and natives were chosen for these endeavors because they had a good reputation as wild-horse hunters. Also, some in war with Spaniards west of Maracaibo fled to Aruba.

The importance of Aruba diminished after the 1648 Peace Treaty between the Netherlands and Spain, and the island was neglected again. In 1655, the Dutch West Indian Company recognized free inhabitants of Aruba as trade partners. These people were assigned a piece of land on which to maintain themselves through cultivation; they also cut and sold wood and exploited marine resources. Alexandre Olivier Exquemelin, who wrote about his experiences as a buccaneer in the Caribbean, gives a description of the Aruban way of life during the second half of the 17th century. Exquemelin points out that the people spoke Spanish, were Catholic, and were visited frequently by Spanish priests from the mainland. As an example of their strong links with the mainland, some 200 residents agreed to leave Aruba in 1723 to raise the Venezuelan town of El Carrizal under the ecclesiastic jurisdiction of the city of Coro.

Dutch government records show that the last true native of Aruba died in Aruba around 1862. However, even today, recognisable features remain in the faces of many of the native Arubans. Recent Mitochondrial DNA Analysis in Aruba has shown the existence of Amerindian DNA still present in population.

Bibliography
(1948).  Handbook of South American Indians. Volume 4. Washington: Smithsonian Institution.
Hertog, Johannes (1961). History of the Netherlands Antilles. Dewitt.
Hutkrantz, Ake (1979). The Religions of the American Indians. M. Setterwall, trans. Berkeley: University of California Press.
Steward, Julian et al., eds (1959). Native Peoples of South America. New York: McGraw Hill.

 Gonzalo Fernández de Oviedo y Valdés: Historia General y Natural de las Indias. Madrid 1959.
 Juan de Castellanos: Elegías de varones ilustres de Indias. Bogotá 1997.
 Indianische Historia; Nicolaus Federmann. Introduction by Juan Friede. München 1965.

References

Arawak peoples
Indigenous peoples in Venezuela
Indigenous peoples of the Caribbean